Koalliella is an extinct genus of prehistoric salamander. It is the oldest known salamandrid.

See also
 Prehistoric amphibian
 List of prehistoric amphibians

References

Salamandridae
Prehistoric amphibian genera
Cenozoic salamanders
Paleogene amphibians of Europe
Fossil taxa described in 1950